Patrik Rorsman (born 1959) FRS FMedSci is Professor of Diabetic Medicine at the Oxford Centre for Diabetes, Endocrinology and Metabolism (OCDEM), in the Radcliffe Department of Medicine at the University of Oxford and a fellow of Harris Manchester College, Oxford.

Education
Rorsman was educated at Uppsala University in Sweden where he was awarded a PhD under the supervision of Nobel laureate Bert Sakmann in 1986 for patch clamp studies of pancreatic cells and their secretion of glucagon and insulin.

Career
Rorsman was for short time the Canadian Excellence in Research Chair (CERC) in Diabetes at the University of Alberta in Edmonton, before being reappointed a Professor at the University of Oxford in 2011.

Research
Rorsman's research investigates exocytosis, ion channels and diabetes mellitus type 2. His research been funded by the Medical Research Council (MRC), the Royal Society, the Wolfson Foundation, the Knut and Alice Wallenberg Foundation, the Wellcome Trust and the Government of Canada.

Awards and honours
Rorsman was elected a Fellow of the Royal Society (FRS) in 2014. His nomination reads: 

Rorsman was elected a Fellow of the Academy of Medical Sciences (FMedSci) in 2010. His nomination reads:

Rorsman was awarded the Minkowski Prize in 1996, the Göran Gustafsson Prize in 2003 and the Albert Renold Prize in 2013.

References

Living people
Fellows of the Academy of Medical Sciences (United Kingdom)
Fellows of the Royal Society
1959 births
Minkowski Prize recipients